The 2021–22 Eerste Divisie, known as Keuken Kampioen Divisie for sponsorship reasons, was the 66th season of Eerste Divisie since its establishment in 1956.

It began on 6 August 2021, and ended with the promotion/relegation playoffs on 29 May 2022.

Relegation for reserve teams 
On 1 August 2020, the KNVB detailed on its website in what scenarios will the reserve teams in the league be relegated from the Eerste Divisie.

Relegation to the Tweede Divisie 

 No reserve team from the Eerste Divisie can be relegated to the Tweede Divisie if the lowest classified reserves team in the Eerste Divisie is in the top 10.
 If the lowest classified reserve team in the Eerste Divisie finishes between 11th through 18th and the highest classified reserve team in the Tweede Divisie finishes first, the two teams play each other in a two-legged tie to decide which team will play in the Eerste Divisie the next season and which team will also play in the Tweede Divisie.
 If the lowest classified reserves in the Eerste Divisie finish 19th or 20th and the highest classified reserves in the Tweede Divisie finish first or second, the lowest classified team from the Eerste Divisie is relegated to the Tweede Divisie while the highest classified reserves in the Tweede Divisie are promoted to the Eerste Divisie.
 If a reserve team plays in the Eerste Divisie and the first team is relegated from the Eredivisie to the Eerste Divisie, the reserves are automatically relegated to the Tweede Divisie. In case this reserve team finished between first through third in the final ranking of reserves, the fourth-placed team is not relegated.

Teams

Team changes 

A total of 20 teams will take part in the league: 17 teams from the 2020–21 Eerste Divisie and 3 teams relegated from the 2020–21 Eredivisie.

Stadiums and locations

Number of teams by provinces

Personnel

Managerial changes

Standings

League table

Positions by round 
The table lists the positions of teams after completion of each round.

Period tables

Period 1

Period 2

Period 3

Period 4

Results

Fixtures and results

Results by round

Promotion/relegation play-offs 
The seeds are assigned based on the final ranking after the regular season. The best ranked team will get the highest seed (lowest number). Eredivisie teams are considered to be better ranked than eerste divisie teams.

In the second leg, if a match is leveled at the end of the normal playing time, extra time will be played (two periods of 15 minutes each) and followed, if necessary, by a penalty shoot-out to determine the winners.

Seven teams, six from the Eerste Divisie and one from the Eredivisie, will play for a spot in the 2022–23 Eredivisie. The remaining six teams will play in the 2022–23 Eerste Divisie. The highest seeded team or the team from the Eredivisie will always host the second leg.

Qualified teams

Bracket

First round

First legs

Second legs

Semifinals

First legs

Second legs

Final

First leg

Second leg

Statistics

Top scorers

Top assists

Clean sheets

Discipline

Player
 Most yellow cards: 9
  Yuya Ikeshita (Jong FC Utrecht)
  Alessio Miceli (FC Dordrecht)
  Brian Koglin (VVV-Venlo)
 Most red cards: 1
 20 players

Club
 Most yellow cards: 87
 FC Dordrecht
 Most red cards: 4
 Jong PSV

References 

Eerste Divisie seasons
2
Netherlands